The San Félix–San Ambrosio Islands temperate forests are a biome located on the small oceanic archipelago known as the Islas Desventuradas The islands form part of the ocean territory of Chile, and are located 850km from the coast of Chile, and about 750km north of the Juan Fernandez Archipelago. Due to their remote nature and difficult conditions, they have not been the subject of great study. The islands themselves are 20km apart, and are likely volcanic in origin.

Climate
Only San Felix's climatic characteristics are known - the climate is Mediterranean, warm, moist, and oceanic. Temperatures range from 14.3 C - 22.5 C, with an average of 17.8 C. Annual rainfall is 94.8mm, occurring mainly in winter (May-August). San Ambrosio is more favorable for the retention of fog, resulting in micro-climates that are more amenable to vegetation.  There are no permanent sources of freshwater on the islands, and it is likely that there are only temporary waterways which only exist during precipitation.

Flora
Due to the aforementioned remoteness, vegetation is not well characterized; only descriptive works from sporadic visits are available. The arid conditions on San Felix are reflected in its low scrubland, where coverage is no more than 25% and is predominantly 20-30cm high bushes with cushions. Plant cover is generally better on San Ambrosio, and in areas that benefit from fog moisture, some specimens of Thamnoseris lacerata have been observed to grow as high as 5m.

External links

References

Ecoregions of Chile
Ecoregions of South America

Neotropical ecoregions
Temperate broadleaf and mixed forests